Raúl Alexander Chávez (born March 18, 1973 in Valencia, Carabobo, Venezuela) is a former baseball catcher. He bats and throws right-handed.

Career
Chávez played for the Montreal Expos (1996–1997), Seattle Mariners (1998), Houston Astros (2000, 2002–2005), Baltimore Orioles (2006), Pittsburgh Pirates (2008), and Toronto Blue Jays (2009). He also played in the New York Yankees minor league system in 2007.

Pittsburgh Pirates 
In 2008, he played for the Pittsburgh Pirates. He declined a minor league assignment on December 10, 2008, becoming a free agent.

Toronto Blue Jays 
On December 22, he signed a minor league contract with an invitation to spring training with the Toronto Blue Jays. He did not make the 25-man Jays' roster out of spring training, and was assigned to Triple A Las Vegas 51s. But an injury to Michael Barrett on April 17 sent Barrett to the disabled list, and Chavez was called up to the Blue Jays the next day to fill the roster spot. He made his 2009 debut catching Ricky Romero at Rogers Centre in Toronto on April 19, in a 1–0 win over the Oakland Athletics.

Chávez is known for his defense, specifically his exceptional arm, and is considered to call a solid game. On June 6, 2009, Chavez hit his first home run for the Toronto Blue Jays, giving them a 2–0 lead over the Kansas City Royals. On December 11, 2009, the Blue Jays declined to tender Chavez a contract, however two days later they signed him to a minor league contract with an invitation to spring training.

New York Mets
On January 14, 2011, the New York Mets signed Chávez to a minor league deal with an invitation to spring training. He spent the season with the Buffalo Bisons before retiring.

See also
 List of Major League Baseball players from Venezuela

References

External links
, or Retrosheet
Pelota Binaria (Venezuelan Winter League)

1973 births
Living people
Asheville Tourists players
Baltimore Orioles players
Bowie Baysox players
Buffalo Bisons (minor league) players
Burlington Astros players
Gulf Coast Astros players
Houston Astros players
Indianapolis Indians players
Jackson Generals (Texas League) players
Las Vegas 51s players
Major League Baseball catchers
Major League Baseball players from Venezuela
Montreal Expos players
Navegantes del Magallanes players
New Orleans Zephyrs players
Osceola Astros players
Ottawa Lynx players
Pittsburgh Pirates players
Round Rock Express players
Scranton/Wilkes-Barre Yankees players
Seattle Mariners players
Sportspeople from Valencia, Venezuela
Tacoma Rainiers players
Tigres de Aragua players
Toronto Blue Jays players
Tucson Toros players
Venezuelan expatriate baseball players in Canada
Venezuelan expatriate baseball players in the United States